Los Angeles is a town in Nuevo León, Mexico, about 75 kilometers north of the city of Monterrey. It is just south of the city of Cerralvo. Los Angeles with about 75 homes has a population of about 300, most of whom reside in the United States at least part-time. Los Angeles local businesses and history touring sites are a Catholic church "Cristo Rey" built in 1973.
 
The main surnames in the town are: Garza, Gonzalez, Guerra, Marichalar, Martinez, Pruneda, Rodriquez, Suarez, Vela, and Villareal.

Populated places in Nuevo León